Chambersburg Township may refer to:

Chambersburg Township, North Carolina
Chambersburg Township, Illinois

See also
Chambersburg (disambiguation)